This is a List of adaptive radiated Hawaiian honeycreepers by form; these are the Hawaiian honeycreepers, especially the extinct forms, lost through late-European colonization. (These are adaptive radiative equivalents.)

Finch-like
? species

Hummingbird-like
? species

(Finch-like) (secondary: hummingbird-like)--(Hawaiian lobelioid-specialist)
1 speciesTrue hummingbird-like species are all extinct.

Parrot-like
4 species

Warbler-like
? species(the only warbler-like?, (the other amakihi 's radiated-?))

Woodpecker-like 
1 species

Alphabetical listing

'Akiapola'au
'Apapane
common amakihi
Kona grosbeak
Hawai'i 'akialoa
'I'iwi

Laysan finch
Maui Nui finch–(no photo)
Maui parrotbill
Nihoa finch
'O'u

Surviving forms in list

'Akiapola'au
'Apapane
common amakihi
'I'iwi

Laysan finch
Maui parrotbill
Nihoa finch

References

Wilson, Eisner, Briggs, Dickerson, Metzenberg, O'Brien, Susman, & boggs. Life on Earth, Edward O. Wilson, Thomas Eisner, Winslow R. Briggs, Richard E. Dickerson, Robert L. Metzenberg, Richard D. O'Brien, Millard Susman, William E. boggs, c 1973, Sinauer Associates, Inc., Publisher, Stamford, Connecticut. 1033 pp, 19 p Index & Back Page (hardcover)

See also

Adaptive radiation
Honeycreepers

.Radiated Hawaiian honeycreepers
Hawaiian honeycreepers, radiated
Hawaiian honeycreepers
Hawaiian honeycreepers
Hawaiian honeycreepers, radiated
Natural history of Hawaii
Speciation